Sthenognatha toddi is a moth in the family Erebidae. It was described by Maureen A. Lane and Allan Watson in 1975. It is found on Jamaica.

References

Moths described in 1975
Sthenognatha